Spring Board Academy is a school which caters to children in grade 1 to grade 8. It is an international school and has 6 branches in both Telugu states spread over Chittoor, Miyapur, Tanuku, Nagole, Tirupati, Mandapeta and Puttur.

References

External links
Official website

Schools in Telangana
Schools in Hyderabad, India
2015 establishments in Telangana
Educational institutions established in 2015